Pernerocrinus is an extinct genus of crinoids from the Devonian.

References

 Dinosaurs to Dodos: An Encyclopedia of Extinct Animals by Don Lessem and Jan Sovak

Cladida
Prehistoric crinoid genera
Late Devonian animals
Devonian echinoderms of Oceania
Devonian echinoderms of Europe